The 2018–19 VMI Keydets basketball team represented the Virginia Military Institute in the 2018–19 NCAA Division I men's basketball season. The Keydets were led by fourth-year head coach Dan Earl and played their home games out of Cameron Hall in Lexington, Virginia, their home since 1981, as members of the Southern Conference. The Keydets finished the season 11–21, 4–14 in SoCon play to finish in a three-way tie for eighth place. As the No. 8 seed in the SoCon tournament, they defeated Western Carolina in the first round before losing to top-seeded Wofford in the quarterfinals.

Previous season 
The Keydets finished the 2017–18 campaign with a 9–21 overall record, and a 4–14 mark in SoCon play to finish in ninth place. The nine wins were three more than the previous season under Earl. They lost in the first round of the SoCon tournament to The Citadel. It was the fourth consecutive season that VMI had failed to advance in the Southern Conference tournament.

Preseason

Departures
The Keydets lost only two seniors from the previous year's team in Fred Iruafemi and Armani Branch. Iruafemi was the team's fourth-leading rebounder and averaged 2.4 points per game. Branch did not play the entire year as he was sidelined with an injury and received a medical redshirt. He chose to transfer and spend his final season of eligibility at Norfolk State.

Coaching changes
On July 3, 2018, VMI head coach Dan Earl announced the addition of Steve Enright as an assistant coach. Enright came from Bridgewater College where he had served for three years on the Eagles' coaching staff. He was also an assistant under head coach Dan Hurley at Rhode Island. Enright replaced Steve Lepore, who left for an assistant coaching position with Eastern Kentucky after three years of service under Earl.

Roster

Ref:

Depth chart

Schedule and results

|-
!colspan=9 style=|Regular season

|-
!colspan=9 style=| Southern Conference tournament

References 

VMI Keydets basketball seasons
VMI
VMI Keydets bask
VMI Keydets bask